JoJo Siwa D.R.E.A.M. The Tour or D.R.E.A.M. The Tour was the debut and currently the only concert tour of American dancer, singer, actress and YouTuber, JoJo Siwa and supported by AEG Presents which ran from 17 May 2019 to 12 March 2022.

Meant to support Siwa's two debut EPs; D.R.E.A.M. The Music (2018) and Celebrate (2019), the tour was initially announced in November 2018 with North American dates being released at the same time, with Australian and U.K. dates announced afterwards. Girl pop group The Belles appeared as support acts on the tour.

Background
On November 7, 2018, Siwa first announced a 26-show tour performing in theaters in North America. On December 11, 2018, Siwa extended the North American leg, adding 28 shows performing in outdoor amphitheatres and arenas. On April 4, 2019, 17 dates were added. On June 10, 2019, 11 more dates were added, marking the total number of shows to 82 in the first leg. On June 18, 2019, dates were announced for Europe in the United Kingdom and Ireland. On September 10, 2019, Siwa announced that the tour will stop in Oceania. On November 18, 2019, she added 50 shows touring North America a second time.

Set list

Tour dates

Cancelled dates

Box office score data

Notes

References

2019 concert tours
2020 concert tours
2022 concert tours
Concert tours of North America
Concert tours of the United Kingdom
Concert tours of Australia
Concert tours postponed due to the COVID-19 pandemic